Calabuch (US title: The Rocket From Calabuch) is a 1956 comedy film directed by Luis García Berlanga.

Synopsis 
Calabuch is a little village in the coast of Spain. There arrives Dr. George Hamilton (Edmund Gwenn), a scientist expert in rockets who is tired of his job.

Hamilton decides to help people of Calabuch in a fireworks competition. He wins and his photo appears in the local newspaper and then NASA and the army find him.

Production background
This Spanish-Italian co-production was filmed in Peniscola, Castellón, and features an international cast led by British-American actor Edmund Gwenn in his last film role, and Italians Valentina Cortese and Franco Fabrizi. Berlanga won the OCIC Award at the Venice Film Festival.

External links

References

1956 films
1950s Spanish-language films
Italian comedy films
Spanish black-and-white films
Spanish comedy films
Spain in fiction
Films directed by Luis García Berlanga
1956 comedy films
1950s Spanish films
1950s Italian films